This article is about hotels in Atlanta, including a brief history of hotels in the city and a list of some notable hotels. 

Founded in the 1830s as a railroad terminus, Atlanta experienced rapid growth in its early years to become a major economic center of Georgia, with several hotels built to accommodate for this growth. Following its destruction during the Civil War, Atlanta experienced a resurgence and another hotel boom commenced in the late 1800s through the early 1900s. In the later half of the 20th century, hotel skyscrapers began to appear on the skyline, including what was at the time the tallest hotel in the United States. More recently, a trend has emerged of converting old office buildings into boutique hotels.

History

Early history through the early 20th century 

The White Hall Inn, located in present-day West End, Atlanta, is generally considered to be one of the first hotels in the area, predating the founding of the city by several years and laying outside the original city limits. As the area's population began to grow following its establishment as a terminus for the Western and Atlantic Railroad in 1837, several hotels arose to service visitors to the city. The first hotel built within city limits came in 1846 with the construction of the Atlanta Hotel. It was joined later that year by Washington Hall. Several more hotels would follow, including the Trout House in 1849. However, these buildings, as well as many other Antebellum era buildings in the city, were destroyed during the Burning of Atlanta, a significant event preceding Sherman's March to the Sea during the American Civil War.

Following the war, Atlanta rebounded and began to rebuild at a rapid pace. New hotels arose to replace those lost during the war, including the Kimball House (1870) and the Markham House (1875). While many of the hotels before and after the war were built around State Square in downtown Atlanta, by the 1890s many of the newer hotels were being built north of the area along "upper Peachtree". Some of these notable buildings included the Majestic Hotel (1898) and the Piedmont Hotel (1903). Also starting around this time, several hotels opened on Hotel Row near the newly opened Terminal Station in South Downtown. Among these was the Terminal Hotel, built in 1906 by prominent Atlanta businessman Samuel M. Inman. However, stiff competition from other hotels in downtown caused the area to experience a decline a few decades later.

Mid-20th century 

Atlanta was home to the deadliest hotel fire in United States when a fire broke out in the Winecoff Hotel on December 7, 1946. In the ensuing disaster, 119 people died. This event contributed to massive changes in North American building codes. The Winecoff would remain abandoned for several years before reopening in the 1950s with a changed name. In 1964, the Supreme Court case Heart of Atlanta Motel, Inc. v. United States pertained to a motel in Atlanta and was a landmark case in the Civil rights movement. The owner of the Heart of Atlanta Motel had refused to rent rooms to African American patrons and the case pertained to Title II of the Civil Rights Act of 1964, which prohibited discrimination in public accommodations. The Supreme Court against the motel owner and affirmed the constitutionality of the act.

Later 20th century 

The later half of the 20th century saw several skyscraper hotels take shape on the Atlanta skyline. John C. Portman Jr.'s Peachtree Center plan included the construction of multiple high-rise hotels in downtown during the 1970s and 1980s. Arguably the most notable of these was the Westin Peachtree Plaza Hotel. Upon its completion in 1976, the building was the tallest hotel in the world, the tallest building in Atlanta, and the tallest building in the Southeastern United States. Other Portman-designed hotels included the Hyatt Regency Atlanta in 1967 and the Atlanta Marriott Marquis in 1985. The hotels in Peachtree Center, along with others in the surrounding downtown area, constitute the Hotel District neighborhood in downtown Atlanta, named in reference of the numerous hotels in the area.

Recent history 
Since the late 1990s, a trend that has emerged in Atlanta has been the repurposing of old office buildings into boutique hotels. In 1996, the Rhodes-Haverty Building (1929) was converted from office space to a hotel, and it currently houses a Residence Inn by Marriott. Similarly, in the 2010s, the Carnegie Building (1925) and the Candler Building (1906) in downtown Atlanta were converted to hotels. Conversely, some historic hotel buildings have been repurposed for other uses, including office space. Examples of this include the Atlanta Biltmore Hotel (1924), which was repurposed for office use in the 1990s, and the Imperial Hotel (1910), which now serves as low-income housing.

List of hotels

References

Bibliography 

 
 
 
 
 
 
 
 
 
 
 
 
 
 
 
 
 
 
 
 
 
 
 
 
 
 
 
 
 
 
 
 
 
 
 
 
 
 
 
 
 
 
 

 
History of Atlanta
Atlanta